Metriochroa celidota is a moth of the family Gracillariidae. It is known from Uganda.

References

Endemic fauna of Uganda
Phyllocnistinae
Insects of Uganda
Moths of Africa